Benzophenone is the organic compound with the formula (C6H5)2CO, generally abbreviated Ph2CO. It is a white solid that is soluble in organic solvents. Benzophenone is a widely used building block in organic chemistry, being the parent diarylketone.

Uses
Benzophenone can be used as a photo initiator in UV(Ultra-violet)-curing applications such as inks, imaging, and clear coatings in the printing industry. Benzophenone prevents ultraviolet (UV) light from damaging scents and colors in products such as perfumes and soaps.

Benzophenone can also be added to plastic packaging as a UV blocker to prevent photo-degradation of the packaging polymers or its contents. Its use allows manufacturers to package the product in clear glass or plastic (such as a PETE water bottle). Without it, opaque or dark packaging would be required.

In biological applications, benzophenones have been used extensively as photophysical probes to identify and map peptide–protein interactions.

Benzophenone is used as an additive in flavorings or perfumes for "sweet-woody-geranium-like notes."

Synthesis
Benzophenone is produced by the copper-catalyzed oxidation of diphenylmethane with air.

A laboratory route involves the reaction of benzene with carbon tetrachloride followed by hydrolysis of the resulting diphenyldichloromethane. It can also be prepared by Friedel–Crafts acylation of benzene with benzoyl chloride in the presence of a Lewis acid (e.g. aluminium chloride) catalyst: since benzoyl chloride can itself be produced by the reaction of benzene with phosgene the first synthesis proceeded directly from those materials.

Another route of synthesis is through a palladium(II)/oxometalate catalyst. This converts an alcohol to a ketone with two groups on each side.

Another, less well-known reaction to produce benzophenone is the pyrolysis of anhydrous calcium benzoate.

Organic chemistry
Benzophenone is a common photosensitizer in photochemistry. It crosses from the S1 state into the triplet state with nearly 100% yield. The resulting diradical will abstract a hydrogen atom from a suitable hydrogen donor to form a ketyl radical.

Benzophenone radical anion

Alkali metals reduce benzophenone to the deeply blue colored radical anion, diphenylketyl:
M  +  Ph2CO   →   M+Ph2CO•−

Generally sodium is used as the alkali metal. Sodium-benzophenone ketyl is used in the purification of organic solvents, particularly ethers, because it reacts with water and oxygen to give non-volatile products. Adsorbents such as alumina, silica gel, and especially molecular sieves are superior and far safer. The sodium-benzophenone method is common since it gives a visual indication that water, oxygen, and peroxides are absent from the solvent. Large scale purification may be more economical using devices which utilize adsorbents such as the aforementioned alumina or molecular sieves. The ketyl is soluble in the organic solvent being dried, which leads to faster purification. In comparison, sodium is insoluble, and its heterogeneous reaction is much slower. When excess alkali metal is present a second reduction may occur, resulting in a color transformation from deep blue to purple:
M  +  M+Ph2CO•−   →   (M+)2(Ph2CO)2−

Commercially significant derivatives and analogues
There are over 300 natural benzophenones, with great structural diversity and biological activities. They are being investigated as potential sources of new drugs.    Substituted benzophenones such as oxybenzone and dioxybenzone are used in many sunscreens. The use of benzophenone-derivatives which structurally resemble a strong photosensitizer has been criticized (see sunscreen controversy).

Michler's ketone has dimethylamino substituents at each para position. The high-strength polymer PEEK is prepared from derivatives of benzophenone.

Safety
It is considered "essentially nontoxic." Benzophenone is however banned as a food additive by the US Food and Drug Administration, despite the FDA's continuing stance that this chemical does not pose a risk to public health under the conditions of its intended use. Benzophenone derivatives are known to be pharmacologically active. From a molecular chemistry point of view interaction of benzophenone with B-DNA has been demonstrated experimentally. The interaction with DNA and the successive photo-induced energy transfer is at the base of the benzophenone activity as a DNA photosensitizers and may explain part of its therapeutic potentialities.

In 2014, benzophenones were named Contact Allergen of the Year by the American Contact Dermatitis Society.

Benzophenone is an endocrine disruptor capable of binding to the pregnane X receptor.

References

Printing materials
Endocrine disruptors
IARC Group 2B carcinogens
Benzophenones
Articles containing video clips